Lost in Paradise is the third album by Canadian pop punk band Faber Drive.

Track listing

2012 albums
Faber Drive albums
604 Records albums